Model Wife is a 1941 American comedy film directed by Leigh Jason and written by Charles Kaufman, Horace Jackson and Grant Garett. The film stars Joan Blondell, Dick Powell, Charlie Ruggles, Lee Bowman, Lucile Watson, Ruth Donnelly and Billy Gilbert. The film was released on April 18, 1941, by Universal Pictures.

Plot

Cast        
Joan Blondell as Joan Keating Chambers
Dick Powell as Fred Chambers
Charlie Ruggles as Milo Everett
Lee Bowman as Ralph Benson
Lucile Watson as J.J. Benson
Ruth Donnelly as Mrs. Milo Everett
Billy Gilbert as Dominic
John Qualen as The Janitor
Lorraine Krueger as Jitterbug
Glen Turnbull as Jitterbug

References

External links
 

1941 films
American comedy films
1941 comedy films
Universal Pictures films
Films directed by Leigh Jason
American black-and-white films
1940s English-language films
1940s American films